José Daniel Silva Marques, known as Daniel Marques (born 28 September 1987) is a Portuguese football player who plays for Ribeirão.

Club career
He made his professional debut in the Segunda Liga for Famalicão on 9 August 2015 in a game against Varzim.

On 31 January 2019, Marques joined Ribeirão.

References

1987 births
Living people
Portuguese footballers
G.D. Joane players
G.D. Ribeirão players
F.C. Famalicão players
Liga Portugal 2 players
Association football defenders